Ngodwana Dam is an earth-fill type dam located on the Ngodwana River, just south of Ngodwana, Mpumalanga, South Africa. It was established in 1982 and serves primarily for municipal use and industrial purposes. The hazard potential of the dam has been ranked high (3).

See also
List of reservoirs and dams in South Africa
List of rivers of South Africa

References 

 List of South African Dams from the Department of Water Affairs and Forestry (South Africa)

Dams in South Africa
Dams completed in 1984